Graciela Vélez Valdez (born 29 June 1977) is a Mexican former professional tennis player.

Valdez represented the Mexico Fed Cup team in 14 ties, between 1994 and 2004, winning three singles and seven doubles rubbers. She was a two-time silver medalist for Mexico at the Central American and Caribbean Games.

ITF finals

Singles: 2 (1–1)

Doubles: 5 (2–3)

References

External links
 
 
 

1977 births
Living people
Mexican female tennis players
Central American and Caribbean Games silver medalists for Mexico
Central American and Caribbean Games medalists in tennis
20th-century Mexican women
21st-century Mexican women